Alyaksandr Heorhiyevich Lebedzew (born 14 April 1985) is a Belarusian former professional footballer.

Career
Born in Zazhevichi, Salihorsk Raion, Lebedzew began playing football in FC BATE Borisov's youth system. He joined the senior team and made his Belarusian Premier League debut in 2003.

In August 2016, Lebedzew was one of several Isloch Minsk Raion players alleged to have been involved in fixing a match with Dinamo Brest on 30 April 2016. On 20 February 2018, the BFF banned him from football for life for his involvement in the match-fixing.

Honours
BATE Borisov
Belarusian Premier League (1): 2006
Belarusian Cup (1): 2005–06

Personal
Lebedzew's brother, Dzmitry, is also a professional footballer.

References

1985 births
Living people
Belarusian footballers
Belarusian expatriate footballers
FC BATE Borisov players
FC Kuban Krasnodar players
FC Dinamo Minsk players
Widzew Łódź players
Expatriate footballers in Russia
Expatriate footballers in Poland
Russian Premier League players
Ekstraklasa players
FC Belshina Bobruisk players
FC Shakhtyor Soligorsk players
FC Gorodeya players
FC Dynamo Brest players
FC Isloch Minsk Raion players
Association football forwards